Niederbreitbach is a municipality and officially recognised climatic health-resort in the district of Neuwied, in Rhineland-Palatinate, Germany. It belongs to Verbandsgemeinde of Rengsdorf-Waldbreitbach.

References

Neuwied (district)